is a Japanese politician of the Democratic Party of Japan, a member of the House of Councillors in the Diet (national legislature). A graduate of Waseda University, he was elected to the House of Councillors for the first time in 2007 after serving in the assembly of Shiga Prefecture.

References

External links 
  in Japanese.

Members of the House of Councillors (Japan)
Waseda University alumni
Living people
1963 births
Democratic Party of Japan politicians